Joan Dixon (June 6, 1930 in Norfolk, Virginia – February 20, 1992 in Los Angeles) was an American film and television actress in the 1950s. She is known for her role  in the film noir Roadblock (1951).

Career
Dixon appeared in ten films (mostly westerns) in the early 1950s, co-starring in a number of cowboy pictures with Tim Holt. She had a starring role in a 1950 crime drama, Experiment Alcatraz. In the late 1950s, she appeared on television, including in Alfred Hitchcock Presents (1956) and in a few episodes of The Ford Television Theatre (1957).

Dixon's career, while under contract at RKO Pictures, was in the hands of Howard Hughes. He attempted but failed to make her into the star he made of Jane Russell (whom Dixon resembled). Hughes had personal contracts with Dixon, Russell, and Janis Carter.

In December 1960, Dixon performed as a vocalist at Dean Martin's nightclub, Dino's Lodge in Los Angeles, California.

Personal life
In October 1952, Dixon eloped and married Chicago, Illinois camera manufacturer Theodore (Ted) Briskin, formerly the husband of Betty Hutton whom he married and divorced twice. Dixon and Briskin were married in a surprise ceremony in the wedding chapel of the Flamingo Hotel, Las Vegas, Nevada; she was 23 and he was 35. Their marriage lasted but three weeks, with Dixon leaving Briskin in early November 1952. She was later married to writer William Driscoll, but they divorced in 1959.

Dixon died on February 20, 1992, in Los Angeles at age 61.

Partial filmography
 Experiment Alcatraz (1950)
 Bunco Squad (1950)
 Law of the Badlands (1951)
 Gunplay (1951)
 Hot Lead (1951)
 Roadblock (1951)
 Pistol Harvest (1951)
 Desert Passage (1952)
 Captain John Smith and Pocahontas (1953)

References
 Los Angeles Times, Hughes Contract Calls for Loan of $8,000,000, September 25, 1952, Page 10.
 Los Angeles Times, Ted Briskin Weds Actress Joan Dixon, October 18, 1952, Page A1.
 Los Angeles Times, Joan Dixon Film Actress, Gets Divorce, January 19, 1954, Page A1.
 Los Angeles Times, Debbie's Divorce From Eddie Noisiest of Loud Splits In 1959, January 2, 1960, Page B1.
 Los Angeles Times, Night Life Scene, December 31, 1960, Page 9.

References

External links
 
 

American film actresses
American television actresses
Actresses from Virginia
Actresses from Los Angeles
Actors from Norfolk, Virginia
Western (genre) film actresses
1930 births
1992 deaths
20th-century American actresses
20th-century American singers
20th-century American women singers